On Tuesday, November 6, 2012, an election was held in Portland, Oregon, to elect the mayor.  Charlie Hales was elected, defeating Jefferson Smith. Incumbent mayor Sam Adams did not seek a second term.

Portland uses a nonpartisan system for local elections, in which all voters are eligible to participate. All candidates are listed on the ballot without any political party affiliation.

All candidates meeting the qualifications competed in a blanket primary election on Tuesday, May 15, 2012. As no candidate received an absolute majority, the top two finishers advanced to a runoff in the November 6 general election. In the general election, former city commissioner Charlie Hales defeated state representative Jefferson Smith with approximately 61% of the vote.

Primary

Candidates on the ballot
 David Ackerman, mailroom operator for The Oregonian
 Tre Arrow, environmental activist
 Max Bauske, student at Portland Community College
 Sam Belisle, manager at Red Robin
 Eileen Brady, businesswoman and co-founder of New Seasons Market
 Loren Brown, screenwriter
 Max Brumm, college student
 Dave Campbell, unemployed
 Robert Carron, artist and writer
 Bill Dant, real estate broker
 Scott Fernandez
 Charlie Hales, former Portland City Commissioner
 Lew Humble, retired mechanic
 Shonda Kelley, homemaker
 Michael Langley, businessman
 Blake Nieman-Davis, businessman
 Josh Nuttall, cashier
 Christopher Rich, media producer
 Scott Rose, architect for DLR Group
 Howie Rubin, insurance agent
 Jefferson Smith, state Representative
 Steve Sung, civil engineer
 Cameron Whitten, Occupy Portland protester

Declined to run
 Sam Adams, incumbent mayor
 Earl Blumenauer, U.S. Representative
 Jeff Cogen, Chairman of the Multnomah County Board of Commissioners
 Jim Francesconi, former Portland City Commissioner
 Steve Novick, political strategist and Democratic candidate for the United States Senate in 2008
 Mike Reese, Chief of the Portland Police Bureau
 Dan Saltzman, Portland City Commissioner

Polling

Results

General election
The November 6 general election was a race between Charlie Hales and Jefferson Smith.

Polling

Results

References

External links
General election candidates
 Charlie Hales for Mayor
 Jefferson Smith for Mayor

Primary candidates
 Max Bauske for Mayor
 Eileen Brady for Mayor
 Loren Brown for Mayor
 Max Brumm for Mayor
 Bill Dant for Mayor
 Scott Fernandez for Mayor
 Shonda Kelley for Mayor
 Chris Rich for Mayor
 Howie Rubin for Mayor
 Steve Sung for Mayor
 Cameron Whitten for Mayor

Mayoral election
2012 Oregon elections
Portland
2012